TDM - Teledifusão de Macau, S. A. (TDM;) provides public broadcasting services in Macau. By running five digital terrestrial television channels, one satellite television channel and two radio channels, TDM provides local audiences with a wide range of content in Macau's two official languages, Chinese and Portuguese, as well as having time-slots for English as well as Indonesian and Tagalog, which reflects the multicultural nature of the city, with 95 percent of the population being Chinese and five percent made up of Portuguese and other ethnic groups.

In the new media era, TDM has extended its services by developing multimedia platforms, including the official website (tdm.com.mo), mobile app (TDM App), social media and content-sharing platforms, allowing local and international audience instant access to information about Macau.

TDM transmits eight television channels from mainland China locally, including CCTV-1, CCTV-13, CGTN, CGTN Documentary, Strait Television, Hunan TV World, Southeast Television, and GDTV World.

History 

TDM was founded by the colonial Portuguese government in 1982, and as a public company, would first begin evening television broadcasts on May 13, 1984, offering a mix of Portuguese and Cantonese programming between 18:00 and 23:00. It was the first television company to be founded in Macau, with news only being reported via radio broadcasts on stations such as Rádio Macau before they were absorbed into TDM.

The company was sold for 50 million patacas into a public-private partnership in 1988 following corruption scandals and major financial losses of up to 90 to 100 million patacas a year. In 1990, the Portuguese and Cantonese television operations were split into separate channels.

2021 broadcasting rules controversy
On March 10, 2021, in light of recent protests in neighbouring Hong Kong which were followed by the passage of national security legislation, TDM executives addressed the company on new broadcasting rules requiring the company to promote "patriotism, respect and love" for mainland China and withhold reports critical of the Chinese government. Several journalists have resigned from the broadcaster as a result of this conflict, with local journalist unions criticizing the rules as a breach of press freedom. Subsequently, the Portuguese Minister of Foreign Affairs Augusto Santos Silva warned them that press freedom is a part of Macao Basic Law, stating that the Portuguese government expects the law to be followed. Chief Executive of Macau Ho Iat-seng denied that press freedom restrictions were being imposed. Following the criticism, TDM's executives stated they would continue to follow their current editorial policy.

Channels

See also
Media of Macau

References

External links
Website 
Website 
Website 

Mass media in Macau
Chinese-language radio stations
Portuguese-language radio stations
Portuguese-language television networks
Multilingual broadcasters
Television channels and stations established in 1982
Companies of Macau
Television in Macau
1982 establishments in Macau
Cantonese-language radio stations
Chinese-language television stations